The 1943 Army Cadets football team represented the United States Military Academy in the 1943 college football season. In their third year under head coach Earl Blaik, the Cadets compiled a 7–2–1 record, shut out five of their ten opponents, and outscored all opponents by a combined total of 299 to 66.  In the annual Army–Navy Game, the Cadets lost to the Midshipmen by a 13 to 0 score. The Cadets also lost to Notre Dame by a 26 to 0 score, but won convincing victories over Colgate (42-0), Temple (51-0), Columbia (52-0), and Brown (59-0). 
 
Two Army players were honored on the 1943 College Football All-America Team. Center Cas Myslinski was a consensus first-team honoree, and tackle Francis E. Merritt was selected as a first-team player by Football News and a second-team player by the Associated Press.

Schedule

References

Army
Army Black Knights football seasons
Army Cadets football